Jackie Abraham-Lawrie (born 22 June 1974) is a New Zealand rower.

She received her secondary education at Wanganui Girls' College (1987–1990). In 2001, she won silver at the World Championships in Lucerne, Switzerland as bow in the four with teammates Kate Robinson (2), Rochelle Saunders (3), and Nicky Coles (stroke).

References 

1974 births
Living people
New Zealand female rowers
Rowers from Whanganui
World Rowing Championships medalists for New Zealand
People educated at Whanganui Girls' College
21st-century New Zealand women